Skidoo may refer to:

 Ski-Doo, a brand of snowmobiles produced by Bombardier Recreational Products
 from this, skidoo as a generic term for all snowmobiles in much of Canada and other parts of the world
 Skidoo, California, a ghost town in the United States
 Skidoo (film), a 1968 film starring Jackie Gleason, Groucho Marx, and Carol Channing
 Skidoo (soundtrack), an album by Harry Nilsson, the original soundtrack recording for the film Skidoo
 "Skidooing," a term used in the TV series Blue's Clues to denote the act of jumping into an object, typically a picture, thus teleporting oneself to another place.

See also
 23 skidoo (disambiguation)
 Skiddaw, a mountain in the Lake District in England